A sports visor, also called a sun visor or visor cap, is a type of crownless hat consisting simply of a visor or brim with a strap or buckle encircling the head. The top of the head is not covered and the visor protects only the face, including eyes, nose, and cheeks, from the sun.

The visor portion of a sun visor may be either curved or flat and the strap is often equipped with an adjustable  velcro fastener in back. The strap can function as a sweatband although usually not. This type of headgear was designed for use in outdoor sports (especially golf, tennis, volleyball, and softball) where eye protection from direct sunlight is desirable, while the missing crown allows for ventilation. It is now often used by non-athletes at beach and other sunny outdoor events.

See also

Green eyeshade
Sportswear
Sun hat

References

Caps
Sportswear
Hats